Fruitvale School District is a kindergarten - 8th grade public school district in Fruitvale, California. The district has five schools and serves Fruitvale and Northwest Bakersfield.

Schools
 Columbia Elementary 
 Discovery Elementary 
 Endeavour Elementary 
 Quailwood Elementary 
 Fruitvale Junior High

References

External links
 

School districts in Kern County, California
School districts established in 1895
1895 establishments in California